Makushino is a town and the administrative center of Makushinsky District in Kurgan Oblast, Russia, located  east of Kurgan, the administrative center of the oblast. Population:

History
It was founded by the migrant peasants who moved there from Central Russia. In 1896, a railway station was built in the vicinity and the settlement grew up around it. Town status was granted to it in 1963.

Administrative and municipal status
Within the framework of administrative divisions, Makushino serves as the administrative center of Makushinsky District. As an administrative division, it is incorporated within Makushinsky District as Makushino Town Under District Jurisdiction. As a municipal division, Makushino Town Under District Jurisdiction is incorporated within Makushinsky Municipal District as Makushino Urban Settlement.

References

Notes

Sources

Cities and towns in Kurgan Oblast